Invincible (Mark Grayson) is an Image Universe superhero created by writer Robert Kirkman and artist Cory Walker, currently drawn by Ryan Ottley. Invincible first appeared in a preview as part of Savage Dragon #102 (August 2002), before graduating to his own self-titled regular series in 2003, as the premier title in Image Comics' then-new superhero line. Invincible appears in Invincible, Bomb Queen, Noble Causes, The Pact, Savage Dragon, The Astounding Wolf-Man, and Dynamo 5.

Born 1987, Invincible is the son of Omni-Man, an extraterrestrial superhero of the Viltrumite race. Invincible inherited his father's complete array of superpowers and he has sworn to protect the Earth. As a teenager, he had trouble adjusting to his newfound powers and coping with the reality of his origins. Invincible is voiced by Patrick Cavanaugh in the 2008 motion comic series, and by Steven Yeun in the 2021 Amazon television series.

Fictional character biography

Noble Causes

In Noble Causes, Invincible is among those suspected of being the father of Zephyr Noble's baby, being confused to have been thought to be. Invincible later attends a party held at the Noble family mansion, and the funeral of Captain Dynamo.

Invincible
In Invincible, Mark Grayson was born to Nolan Grayson, a Viltrumite male, and Deborah Grayson, a human female. When Mark was seven years old, his dad told him that he was an alien from a different planet, and the superhero known as Omni-Man. Mark was told that the Viltrumites are virtually a race of peaceful Supermen. Mark learned that his father had come to Earth to protect it, and that one day Mark would develop superpowers like Nolan. Every single day, he waited for his powers to develop. One day in his senior year of high school, when working at his part time job, he sent a trash bag flying through the sky. Nolan eventually had his friend Art make Mark a superhero costume, but Mark needed to choose a name first. After protecting a classmate from being bullied, he was sent to the principal's office, who commended him, but warned him that he isn't "invincible" or anything. Mark liked the name and used it for his superhero identity.

The Pact

In The Pact, set shortly after Mark's breakup with Amber, he is among those brought together by Petra / Quantum Girl to form the superhero team the Pact in order to face the multiversal conqueror Reaver, alongside Duncan Rosenblatt / Firebreather, Eddie Collins / ShadowHawk and Zephyr Noble. Over the course of their journey, Mark acquires the nickname "Vince" from Zephyr, befriending her alongside Duncan and Eddie, and forms a romantic relationship with Petra. After failing to destroy the Reaver, who successfully conquers Earth in the future and consumes the Viltrumite Empire, killing Mark, Petra sacrifices her existence to destroy the Reaver and prevent his invasion from taking place, saving Mark in the past, who (alongside Duncan) retains a memory of her name and significance every time they awake. The next day, Mark punches Doc Seismic in the face.

Bomb Queen

In Bomb Queen, Invincible vigorously denies being in a secret relationship with the titular character after accusations by a reporter. Following Bomb Queen's bombardment of America, Invincible is seen in Baltimore clearing away wreckage and helping survivors.

Dynamo 5

In Dynamo 5: Sins of the Father, Invincible is among those who unite to face off against the three sons of Dominex, who seek to regain their family's honour after their father had been defeated and spared from dying in combat by Captain Dynamo, Supreme and Omni-Man thirty years prior.

Continuity
Invincible, along with Firebreather and other new Image Universe superhero characters, debuted in an issue of The Savage Dragon, and has since appeared with several of the characters in The Pact mini-series. Robert Kirkman wrote a miniseries, Savage Dragon: God War and two SuperPatriot mini-series, establishing the friendship between SuperPatriot's wife Claire and Invincible's mother in the pages of Invincible #15 and later. Invincible also appears in the fourth issue of Jay Faerber's Noble Causes, and was seen at the funeral of Captain Dynamo, father of the characters in Faerber's Dynamo 5. Invincible is also present in the fourth volume of Bomb Queen. Similarly, Invincible #48 features cameo appearances from several Savage Dragon characters, as well as both Dynamo 5, and many of Kirkman's own creations, while an earlier issue featured a funeral for the Guardians of the Globe, at which many Image characters, including Savage Dragon and Jack Staff, were in attendance.

Invincible #60 is a "done-in-one crossover event" with characters such as Spawn and Witchblade making appearances. During the invasion of Invincible's evil counterparts from alternate dimensions, the reader saw all Image heroes, like Spawn, Savage Dragon, Witchblade, Darkness, Firebreather, and Pitt fighting invaders alongside Invincible, the Guardians of the Globe, Brit, and Wolf-Man.

Image published Image United tie-in one-shot called Image United: Interlude. Shipping in March 2010, Invincible is prominently featured on the teaser cover of the first issue in front of a group of silhouetted characters covered in a classified information label. The website claims: "This March the effects of IMAGE UNITED go global with a glimpse of the crossover's impact on INVINCIBLE and many other Image Comics favorites..."

In other media

Motion comics
Mark Grayson / Invincible is voiced by Patrick Cavanaugh in a 2008 motion comic adaptation of the series, created by Gain Enterprises using the Bomb-xx process and broadcast on MTV2 and downloadable to mobile phones, from iTunes, and Amazon.

Television series

Steven Yeun voices Mark Grayson / Invincible in the Amazon Prime Video streaming television series of the same name, adapting similar events of the comic series. Its first season premiered on March 26, 2021.

References
  Text was copied from Invincible (Mark Grayson) at the Image Comics Database, which is released under a Creative Commons Attribution-Share Alike 3.0 (Unported) (CC-BY-SA 3.0) license.

External links
 Invincible at Image Comics
 Invincible at Comicvine

 
2002 comics debuts
Asian-American superheroes
Characters created by Robert Kirkman
Comics characters introduced in 2002
Fictional characters displaced in time
Fictional characters with slowed ageing
Fictional characters with superhuman durability or invulnerability
Fictional extraterrestrial–human hybrids in comics
Fictional victims of sexual assault
Fictional characters with post-traumatic stress disorder
Fictional high school students
Galactic emperors
Fictional emperors and empresses
Image Comics characters with accelerated healing
Image Comics extraterrestrial superheroes
Image Comics male superheroes
Image Comics characters who can move at superhuman speeds
Image Comics characters with superhuman strength
Image Comics superheroes
Savage Dragon characters
Teenage characters in comics
Teenage superheroes